Luteum or lutea may refer to:
Buglossidium luteum or Solenette
Calostemma luteum
Chamaelirium luteum or Chamaelirium
Eriastrum luteum
Oncis lutea
Pentalinon luteum
Rhododendron luteum
Trillium luteum

See also
Atretic corpus luteum
Corpus luteum
Corpus luteum cyst
Luteal phase
Luteinizing hormone